Thierry Hermès (10 January 1801 – 10 January 1878) was a French businessman who founded Hermès International and acquired the title as a fashion house designer. He was born in 1801 in Krefeld, Germany. Hermès originally established his business as a saddle company in 1837. His first workshop showcased jewelry, home decor items, and silk scarves. His father Thierry Hermès originated from France and his mother, Agnese Kuhnen originated from Germany. He lost his family due to disease and moved to Paris in 1821. After his death in 1878, his son and grandsons Charles-Emile Hermès, Adolphe Hermès and Emile-Maurice, continued to run the family business.

Early life
Thierry Hermès was born in 1801 in the city of Krefeld, which at the time was part of Napoleon's empire, earning Hermès French citizenship. He was the sixth child of his parents who were innkeepers. After he lost his entire family to disease and war, he moved to France in 1821 as an orphan. Using his gift in leatherworking, he opened his saddle and harness shop in 1837 located in the Paris neighborhood known as Grands Boulevard.

Career
In 1837, Thierry Hermès founded the Hermès company as a manufacturer of horse harnesses on the Rue Basse du Rempart in Paris. Hermès specialized in the horse harnesses required by society traps, caleches, and carriages. He built his business on the strength of a stitch that could only be done by hand. The saddle stitch was completed when two needles worked two waxed linen threads in tensile opposition. After opening up his shop, his clients were the rich which included: the Parisian beau monde and European royalty, the emperor Napoleon III and his empress, Eugenie. The business soon went from harness and saddles to trunks, handbags, and zippers.

Children 
Hermès had one son with his wife Christine Pétronille Pierrart (1805-1896) who they named Charles-Emile. Charles-Emile had two sons of his own, Adolphe and Emile-Maurice, who were involved in the family business building elite clientele in Europe, North Africa, Russia, America, and Asia. After Hermès started his harness company, his son Charles-Emile Hermès took over the family business moving the store to 24 rue du Faubourg Saint-Honoré. This meant that the store was in proximity to wealthy clients. Adolphe left Emile with the business because he believed that the company didn't have a long future in the era of carriages. Emile-Maurice noticed the demand for saddlery, leading him to direct Hermès to make "saddle stitched" leather goods and trunks for the customers who traveled by car, train, ship. After realizing the company was diving into the age of automobiles, Emile-Maurice acquired a two-year patent for the zipper which was known as the "Hermès Fastener." Once the zipper was introduced, the clothing era was transformed. Other businesses such as Coco Chanel wanted to learn from them due to their rapid growth and popularity. Emile Hermès' sons-in-law, Robert Dumas-Hermès (1898-1978) and Jean-René Guerrand-Hermès (1901-1993) took over the company in 1950. The contributions from his children and grandchildren influenced the company." In 1993, the company went public but 80 percent of the shares were controlled by Hermès family members.

Legacy 
Hermès has many innovations which are still known to this day. The Hermès zipper founded in 1923 is used in many of the bags today. The silk Hermès used for jockeys' blouses developed the first silk scarf, "Jeu des Omnibus et Dames blanches" in 1923. Around the 1930s, Hermès International launched several items that became classics, including the large crocodile handbag known later as the Kelly, named for Grace Kelly. The company later developed men's neckties, watches, and new scarf designs. Today, Hermès features products like charms (starting at $40) and an oversize panda-bear bean-bag made of Clémnce bull-calf leather (most expensive at $100,000). One of the known classics, the Birkin, was named after actress Jane Birkin and created by Jean-Louis Dumas in 1984.  Today, Hermès has 283 stores worldwide. Since 1923, Hermès has a  color theme every year for their collections, creating limited edition items like the "Year of the River" (2005) silk scarf.

References

1801 births
1878 deaths
People from Krefeld
19th-century French businesspeople
Businesspeople from Paris
German people of French descent
Hermès-Dumas family